Chambermade is a various artists compilation album released in 1995 by Cargo Music and Re-Constriction Records.

Reception
Larry Dean Miles of Black Monday gave Chambermade a positive review and pointed to "the intense simplicity of Clay People's powerful guitar oriented crunch, the ever charming 16 Volt, and Non-Aggression Pact's thumping, enduring pulse." Sonic Boom mostly praised the album but noted Non-Aggression Pact's contribution as being a detractor.

Track listing

Personnel
Adapted from the Chambermade liner notes.

 Chase – compiling

Release history

References

External links 
 Chambermade at Discogs (list of releases)

1995 compilation albums
Cargo Music compilation albums
Re-Constriction Records compilation albums